Felipe Giaffone (born 22 January 1975) is a Brazilian racing driver. He competes full-time in the Copa Truck, driving the No. 4 Iveco Hi-Way for Usual Racing. He also works as a commentator for Rede Bandeirantes and BandSports.

He competed in the Indy Racing League between 2001 and 2006. His father, "Zeca" Giaffone is the 1987 Stock Car Brasil champion and Mil Milhas Brasil five times winner in the 1980s.

Racing career
He went to the United States to drive in the Indy Lights series in 1999 where he was coached by Formula One legend and countryman Nelson Piquet. He began racing in the IRL in 2001 and won one race at Kentucky Speedway in 2002. In 2003 Felipe was one of the IRL's representatives in the IROC series, but he only competed in two races due to injury and finished 10th in series standings. In 2005 Felipe made a last minute deal with A. J. Foyt to qualify a third car for him in the Indianapolis 500. With minutes to spare, Giaffone bumped Arie Luyendyk Jr. from the field. Starting in the final 33rd starting position, he avoided attrition and finished 15th. With A. J.'s grandson A. J. Foyt IV leaving the IRL for NASCAR in 2006, A. J. the elder chose Giaffone to be his full-time driver for the 2006 season but he was released after eight races due to what Foyt called "communication problems".

Since 2007, Giaffone has raced in the Fórmula Truck, the Brazilian racing truck series. He won the championship four times in 2007, 2009, 2011 and 2016, and was runner-up in 2010, 2012 and 2014.

Racing record

American Open Wheel racing results
(key)

Indy Lights

IndyCar Series

IndyCar Series career summary

Indianapolis 500

Fórmula Truck

Family
The Giaffone family has had great involvement in motorsport.

 José "Zeca" Giaffone - Felipe's father; 1987 Stock Car Brasil champion and five times winner of Mil Milhas Brasil: 1981, 1984, 1986, 1988 and 1989. The founder of JL Racing, the biggest racing engine supplier in Brazil and Stock Car Brasil chassis supplier, and the owner of Granja Viana international kart circuit in Cotia, near São Paulo city.
 José "Zequinha" Giaffone - Felipe's brother; He competed in some races in the 1996 Indy Lights.
 Affonso Giaffone Júnior - Felipe's uncle, Zeca's elder brother; The winner of the first ever race of Stock Car Brasil in 1979, the champion of the 1981 season and two times winner of Mil Milhas Brasil: 1981 and 1986. His four sons all competed in the Brazilian national kart championships.
 Affonso Giaffone - Felipe's cousin, Affonso Junior's son; He competed in the 1996-1997 Indy Racing League season.
 Silvana Giaffone - Felipe's cousin and later Ex wife of Rubens Barrichello. This makes Barrichello a cousin-in-law of Felipe.

References

External links
 History of the kart circuit - from Granja Viana kart circuit official website
 

1975 births
Living people
Brazilian people of Italian descent
Racing drivers from São Paulo
Brazilian racing drivers
IndyCar Series drivers
Brazilian IndyCar Series drivers
Indianapolis 500 drivers
Indy Lights drivers
Atlantic Championship drivers
International Race of Champions drivers
TC 2000 Championship drivers
24 Hours of Daytona drivers
Rolex Sports Car Series drivers
Stock Car Brasil drivers
Mo Nunn Racing drivers
A. J. Foyt Enterprises drivers
Dreyer & Reinbold Racing drivers
Conquest Racing drivers